Luke Brandon (1925–2012) was a guitarist from Roane County, Tennessee. He played on several major records throughout his career as a guitarist. Noted artists that feature Brandon's guitar work are the Everly Brothers, Bobby Bare, Fats Domino, Frankie Avalon, and Sgt. Barry Sadler just to name a few. Perhaps his career peak was a stint in Ohio at Fraternity Records fronting the house band known as "Luther Brandon and His All-American Boys Orchestra." He returned to East Tennessee where he worked at Ciderville Music in Powell and gigging locally. Luke died February 2012 at the age of 87.

References

2012 deaths
1925 births
People from Roane County, Tennessee
Guitarists from Tennessee
20th-century American guitarists
21st-century American guitarists